Hendrik Muller Szn. (24 July 1819 — 15 August 1898) was a Dutch merchant and politician. He is the father of Hendrik Pieter Nicolaas Muller.

Biography 

Hendrik Muller Szn. (Samuelzoon) was born in Amsterdam on 24 July 1819. His father Samuel Muller was a professor at the Mennonite Church seminary in Amsterdam. Muller was educated in business and moved to Rotterdam. Muller became involved in the trade with Africa through his partner, and later brother-in-law, Huibert van Rijckevorsel in 1851 and his future father-in-law the Rotterdam-based merchant and politician . He married Marie Cornelie van Rijckevorsel in 1851. Muller and Marie Cornelie had six children, of whom two died young. His son Hendrik Pieter Nicolaas Muller was born in 1859 in Rotterdam. Following Huibert's retirement in 1863, the company was renamed Hendrik Muller & Co. and specialized in trade with Liberia and the Gold Coast.

In 1874, he was named a knight in the Order of the Netherlands Lion.

In 1879, the Afrikaansche Handelsvereeniging, the chief African trading company in Rotterdam, went bankrupt and its founder , then a Dutch senator, fled the country to avoid prosecution. Hendrik Muller was placed in charge of the company's liquidation and subsequently reorganized the company's business into the Nieuwe Afrikaanse Handels-Vennootschap.

As politician, Muller was a proponent of free trade. He was elected member of the City Council of Rotterdam between 1873–1885, of the Provincial States of South Holland from 1877–1881, and the Dutch Senate from 1881 to 1898.

In 1883, Muller along with his nephew , were among the founders of the Wereldmuseum in Rotterdam.

Muller also worked as co-editor for De Economist and Tijdschrift voor Nederlandsch-Indië.

Muller died in Wiesbaden on 15 August 1898.

References

Bibliography 
 Muller, Hendrik. ''Muller. Een Rotterdams Zeehandelaar. Hendrik Muller Szn (1819-1898).'' (Schiedam: Interbook International B.V. [1977]).

External link

1819 births
1898 deaths
Dutch magazine editors
Knights of the Order of the Netherlands Lion
Businesspeople from Rotterdam
19th-century Dutch politicians
Members of the Senate (Netherlands)
19th-century Dutch businesspeople
Museum founders
Academic journal editors
19th-century philanthropists
Municipal councillors of Rotterdam
Directors of museums in Rotterdam